Harry Spurway was an Australian professional soccer player who played as a half-back. He played for NSW clubs Granville and Gladesville and the Australia national team.

Club career

1920–1925: Granville
Spurway announced his retirement from first-class soccer and leave Granville on 31 March 1925.

1925–1928: Gladesville
Ten days later after his first class retirement, it was announced in the Arrow newspapers on 10 April 1925 that Spurway joined the Gladesville club. He retired from soccer on 27 April 1928, finishing his career at Gladesville.

International career
Spurway began his international career with Australia in a 1–0 loss to Canada on 14 June 1924. He appeared three more times with his fourth and final cap coming in a 1–0 win over Canada on 26 July 1924.

Career statistics

International

Honours
Granville
 Sydney Metropolitan First Division: 1923, 1924

Gladesvile
 Sydney Metropolitan First Division: 1927

References

Australian soccer players
Australia international soccer players
Association football midfielders